R.V. Swamy ("அந்தாதி கவிஞர்" ஆர்.வீ. ஸ்வாமி), an engineer by profession, is a devotee of Sri Ranganatha. He is a Retd. Highways Engineer, devoted to Sri Vaishnavar and a Vaasthu scholar.

Life
R.V. Swamy was born on 9 May 1948 at Udumalpet, Tamil Nadu, India. After completing his schooling in Udumalpet, he pursued his higher education at Coimbatore Institute of Technology, Coimbatore. He started his career as a Highways Engineer but was interested towards Vaishnavism and Vaastu Shastra.
 
In the 1990s, he first wrote Sri Akkammadevi Thiruvanthathi praising his Kula devatha Sri Akkammadevi. Swamy also brought out 8 more Andhathis .

Service
R.V. Swamy, after 34 years of service to Tamil Nadu Highways Department (1972–2006), retired as a Divisional Engineer. He contributed towards Vaishnavism and Tamil literature even after retirement. His literary work — A Poetry Book titled Divyadesa Manimalai (PartI/II/III) with 8000+ phrases presents 108 Divyadesams, rare temple deity pictures, temple sthala puranam, Azhwar/Acharya vaibhavam, thirukoyil vaibhavam, guruparamparai vaibhavam, temple functions, palasruthi, etc.,

Contributions
Vaishnavism
He has written 23 Andhathi’s in Tamil, praising the glories of Sriman Narayana and his disciples. His writings started with "குலதேவி மணிமாலை, a poetry book with 150+ songs on Sri Akkammadevi, Sri Renugadevi and Sriman Narayana. With lot of encouragement from his friends & family and support of his Acharya "அண்ணா" - ஸ்ரீ ரங்கராஜா பட்டர் and திருக்கோட்டியூர் ஸ்ரீ ராமானுஜாச்சார்யர் he contributed some writings to the vaishnava world, which include:

He had affection and bhakthi towards Vaishnava Acharya Sri Ramanuja made him to bring out a book Swamyin Ramanuja Vaibhavam - ஸ்வாமியின் ராமானுச வைபவம்" depicting the life of Sri Ramanujacharya and Guruparmparai Vaibhavam.

Vaastu ShastraBeing an expert in Indian Vaastu Shastra, he is the author of four books in Vaastu, published by Vijaya Pathipagam, Coimbatore, Tamil Nadu. He has delivered lectures on the Vaastu Shastra in colleges, conferences and in public functions and claims to propagate Vaastu through his lectures, seminars, slide-shows, writings and research.

Books on வாஸ்து சாஸ்திரம் (Vaasthu Shastra).

Awards and titles
In 2003, he was crowned with the title "Andhathi Kavingar" R.V. Swamy by the Vaishnava magazine venkatathri krupa.

In 2010, he was awarded "Vaishna Rathna" award by the Vaishnava scholars in Thirunagur Vaishnva Conference.

Publications
VAASTHU PUBLICATIONS:
1. Swamyin Valam tharum Vaastu Shastra – General (ஸ்வாமியின் வளம் தரும் வாஸ்து சாஸ்திரம் - பொது)
2. Swamyin Valam tharum Vaastu Shastra – Industries (ஸ்வாமியின் வளம் தரும் வாஸ்து சாஸ்திரம் - தொழிற்சாலை)
3. Swamyin Vaastu Predictions (ஸ்வாமியின் வாஸ்து கணிப்புகள்)
4. Vaastu Shastrathil Inniyavai Naarpathu Inna Naarpathu (வாஸ்து சாஸ்த்ரத்தில் இனியவை நாற்பது இன்னா நாற்பது)

VAISHNAVA PUBLICATIONS:

Vaishnava Books
1. Swamyin Ramanuja Vaibhavam (ஸ்வாமியின் இராமானுச வைபவம்)
2. Kuladevi Manimalai (குலதேவி மணிமாலை)
3. Swamyin Divyadesa Manimalai (Part I, II & III) (ஸ்வாமியின் திவ்யதேச மணிமாலை)

Andhathi

1. Thiruvarangan Thiruvandhathi (திருவரங்கன் திருவந்தாதி)
2. Kothai Thiruvandhathi (கோதை திருவந்தாதி)
3. Kannan Thiruvandhathi (கண்ணன் திருவந்தாதி)
4. Kakuthan Thiruvandhathi (காகுத்தன் திருவந்தாதி)
5. Periyanambi Thiruvanthathi (பெரியநம்பி திருவந்தாதி)
6. Kuresan Thiruvanthathi (கூரேசன் திருவந்தாதி)
7. Nadathur Ammal Thiruvanthathi (நடாதூர் அம்மாள் திருவந்தாதி)
8. Akkammadevi Thiruvanthathi (அக்கம்மா தேவி திருவந்தாதி)
9. Anna Thiruvanthathi (அண்ணா திருவந்தாதி)

His writings were published by Vijaya Pathipagam of Coimbatore.

In addition, his Vaishnava writings are also published in the below Vaishnava monthly/weekly magazines :
1. Alayadharisanam — Bhuvanagiri, Kadalur
2. Bhagavatha Dharmam — Sri Rangam
3. Paanchasainyam— Sri Rangam
4. Kavalipadathae — Chennai5. Vaithamaanithi — Vaniyambadi
6. Venkatathri Krupa — Coimbatore

R.V. Swamy's Vaasthu தொடர் கட்டுரை has been published in the weekly Tamil magazine Bhagya, Chennai for 80 weeks.

References

External links
 http://swamysvaasthushastra.com/

Sri Vaishnavism
People from Coimbatore
Living people
1948 births